The ninth season of the police procedural drama series Hawaii Five-0  premiered on CBS on September 28, 2018, for the 2018–19 television season in the United States. CBS renewed the series for a ninth season in April 2018, that was originally expected to contain 22 episodes; however, CBS ordered additional episodes bringing the total count to 25. The season concluded on May 17, 2019.

The series continues to center on the Five-0 Task Force, a specialized state police task force, established by the Hawaiian Governor that investigates major crimes in the state of Hawaii including murder, terrorism, and human trafficking. The ninth season features ten starring roles, all of which returned from the previous season. In addition, former main cast members, Michelle Borth and Taryn Manning, reprised their roles in a guest starring capacity as their characters Lieutenant Catherine Rollins and Marry Ann McGarrett in the seasons eleventh and twenty-third episodes, respectively. Former major recurring cast members including Mark Dacascos and Terry O'Quinn also returned as guest stars after long absences in the series. Numerous cast members also appeared as guest stars on Magnum P.I. which Peter M. Lenkov is also the showrunner on and which is also filmed in Hawaii.

The ninth season ranked 26th for the 2018–19 television season and had an overall average of 10.01 million viewers. "Ka ʻōwili ʻōkaʻi," the season premiere, brought in 7.49 million viewers; meanwhile, "Hana Mao 'ole ka ua o Waianae," the season finale, was viewed by 5.11 million viewers. The series was also renewed for a tenth season which premiered on September 27.

Cast and characters

Main cast
 Alex O'Loughlin as Lieutenant Commander Steven "Steve" McGarrett, United States Navy Reserve
 Scott Caan as Detective Sergeant Daniel "Danny" "Danno" Williams
 Ian Anthony Dale as Officer Adam Noshimuri
 Meaghan Rath as Officer Tani Rey
 Jorge Garcia as Special Consultant Jerry Ortega
 Beulah Koale as Officer Junior Reigns 
 Taylor Wily as Kamekona Tupuola
 Dennis Chun as Sergeant Duke Lukela, Honolulu Police Department
 Kimee Balmilero as Dr. Noelani Cunha, Medical Examiner
 Chi McBride as Captain Lou Grover

200th episode
In the 200th episode which was set in 1941, the main cast portrayed characters separate from their normal roles. The actor/character portrayals in the episode are as follows:

 Alex O'Loughlin as Steve McGarrett, grandfather of the present day character
 Scott Caan as Milton Cooper
 Ian Anthony Dale as Earl Blackstone
 Meaghan Rath as Alexa Alana
 Jorge Garcia as Officer Mike Flanagan
 Beulah Koale as Evan Kekoa
 Taylor Wily as “Biggie” Tupa
 Dennis Chun as Sergeant Naskiuchi
 Kimee Balmilero as Doctor
 Chi McBride as Captain Charles Sumner

Recurring
 Shawn Thomsen as Officer Pua Kai
 Rochelle Aytes as Agent Greer
 Shawn Mokuahi Garnett as Flippa
 Zach Sulzbach as Charlie Williams

Guest stars

 Mark Dacascos as Wo Fat
 Jack Coleman as Miller
 Duane "Dog" Chapman as himself
 Andrew Lawrence as Eric Russo
 Laura Mellow as Nalani Lukela
 Cidni Romias as Akela Nakahara
 Eric Steinberg as Captain Keo
 Eddie Cahill as Carson Rodes
 Richard Herd as Milton Cooper
 Chris Mulkey as William Pettifer
 Mariano Farrar as Clarence Whitmour
 Clifton Powell as Percy Lee "PJ" Grover Jr.
 Louis Gossett Jr. as Percy Grover Sr.
 Gladys Knight as Ella Grover
 Michelle Hurd as Renee Grover
 Chosen Jacobs as Will Grover
 Al Harrington as Mamo Kahike
 Terry O'Quinn as Joe White
 Michelle Borth as Catherine Rollins
 Chris Vance as Harry Langford
 David Keith as Wade Gutches
 Claire van der Boom as Rachel Hollander
 Teilor Grubbs as Grace Williams
 Bob Hiltermann as Hal
 Eric Scanlan as Natano Reigns
 Reed Diamond as Claude Nostromo
 Anna Enger as Layla Lee
 J.J. Soria as Tory Lehea 
 Michael Ironside as Robert Castor
 Joan Collins as Amanda Savage
 Ted McGinley as Special Agent Samuel "Sam" Collins
 Willie Garson as Gerard Hirsch
 Ryan Bittle as John McGarrett
 Brittany Ishibashi as Tamiko Masuda
 Eric Elizaga as Young Duke Lukela
 Erin Smith as Young Doris McGarrett
 Revel Kolohe Sloboda as Young Steve McGarrett
 Charlie Saxton as Ricky Schiff
 Taryn Manning as Mary Ann McGarrett
 Matthew Lawrence as Josh Baker
 Joey Lawrence as Aaron Wright
 Ashley Chewning as Jane Martin

Episodes

The number in the "No. overall" column refers to the episode's number within the overall series, whereas the number in the "No. in season" column refers to the episode's number within this particular season. The titles of each episode are in the Hawaiian language, though its English translations are directly underneath. "Prod. code" refers to the order in which the episodes were produced. "U.S. viewers (millions)" refers to the number of viewers in the U.S. in millions who watched the episode as it was aired.

Crossovers
On July 19, 2018, it was announced that the season would see multiple crossovers with Magnum P.I. Lenkov confirmed the announcement and Kimee Balmilero as well as Taylor Wily made guest appearances as their Hawaii Five-0 characters in episodes one and two of Magnum P.I., respectively. Meanwhile, Alex O'Loughlin was set to cross paths with Jay Hernandez's character, Thomas Magnum, later in the season in a crossover event, however a full crossover event did not air until the following television season. Balmilero and Wily continued to make guest appearances throughout the first season. Dennis Chun appeared in the seventeenth episode.

Production

Development

On April 18, 2018, CBS renewed the series for a ninth season. Peter M. Lenkov returned as executive producer and showrunner after signing a new multi-year deal with CBS. On July 9, 2018, it was announced that the ninth season is set to premiere on September 28, 2018, for the 2018–19 television season. The season contained the series 200th episode. The season was expected to contain 22 episodes. It was later revealed that the first episode of the season would be a remake of the 1968 episode from the original series, Hawaii Five-O, also entitled "Cocoon" On August 18, 2018, it was revealed that the 200th episode of the series would be the seventh aired episode of the season. Other series co-star Chi McBride, wrote an episode for the season. On Wednesday, August 22, 2018 with the anticipated landfall of Hurricane Lane, a Category 4 hurricane, in Hawaii CBS reported that they "were closely monitoring the situation" but that production would continue as planned. The following day CBS temporarily shut down production of both Hawaii Five-0 and Magnum P.I. until further notice. In a later interview Lenkov confirmed that CBS ordered additional episodes to the season bringing the count to 25. The season finale consisted of two episodes in a two-part story. The series was renewed by CBS for a tenth season on May 9, 2019, which premiered on September 27, 2019.

Filming
Filming for the season officially began on July 10, 2018, with a traditional Hawaiian blessing and concluded on April 19, 2019. Bryan Spicer returned as producing director and is expected to direct five episodes of the season. Primary filming for the season takes place in Honolulu, Hawaii, on the island of Oahu. The series holds a sound stage at Hawaii Film Studio in Diamond Head where it films many indoor scenes. Exterior shots and outdoor scenes for McGarrett's house are filmed at the Bayer Estate in Aina Haina. On July 11, 2018, it was revealed that the first episode to film would be third aired episode of the season. On July 20, 2018, Lenkov reported that Alex O' Loughlin would direct another episode. Filming on the first filmed episode of the season officially concluded on July 20, 2018. Meanwhile, filming was temporarily canceled in August 2018 as a result of an incoming hurricane. It was later revealed that O'Loughlin would direct the seventeenth episode of the season.

Casting
When asked about the mid-season finale, Lenkov stated, "We're bringing back a lot of people that over the years have helped us". On August 22, 2018, it was reported by TVLine that Rochelle Aytes had been cast in a guest role as a character named Greer. Mark Dacascos returned to the series as Wo Fat for the first time since the fifth season. It was later announced that Louis Gossett Jr. and Gladys Knight would guest star in an episode as the father and mother respectively of McBride's character, Lou Grover. On November 20, 2018 it was announced that Terry O'Quinn would return in the season's mid-season finale, while on December 4, 2018 it was reported that former main cast member Michelle Borth would return for the mid-season premiere. It was revealed on January 18, 2019 that Joan Collins  guest starred in an episode as Amanda Savage. On March 6, 2019, it was reported that former main cast member Taryn Manning, who last appeared as a guest star in the sixth season, would be returning as Mary Ann McGarrett. Joey Lawrence, who appeared as a guest star in the eighth season, returned as a guest star in the two-part season finale. Series regular Ian Anthony Dale returned to the series in episode six due to conflicting filming of other CBS television series Salvation in which he was also a series regular.

Release and marketing
The teaser trailer for the first episode was released on September 12, 2018. The season has been marketed as the series' fiftieth anniversary, being fifty years since the premiere of the original series in 1968. On August 13, 2018, it was announced that the season would have an advanced premiere screening along with an advanced premiere screening of Magnum P.I. The season premiered on September 28, 2018, in the 2018–19 television season. It held the same time slot of the previous five seasons airing Fridays at 9 p.m. ET, with the exception of the seventeenth episode which aired immediately after the sixteenth episode at 10 p.m. ET.  The season concluded on May 17, 2019, after airing 25 episodes.

Reception

Ratings

Home media

References

External links
 
 
 List of Hawaii Five-0 episodes at The Futon Critic
 

Hawaii Five-0 (2010 TV series) seasons
2018 American television seasons
2019 American television seasons